Roman Anatoliyovych Butenko (30 March 1980 – 30 November 2012) was a Ukrainian professional footballer who played as a midfielder.

Career

Polissya Zhytomyr
In 2001 Butenko moved to the Ukrainian First League club Polissya Zhytomyr.

Metalist Kharkiv
In January 2008 Butenko moved to Metalist Kharkiv. He played initially for the reserves squad, but was promoted by head coach Myron Markevych to the senior squad in the beginning of the 2008–09 season. Butenko played 1 match for Metalist Kharkiv in the Ukrainian Premier League.

Personal life
On 30 November 2012 Butenko died in a car accident.

References

External links 
Official Website Profile
Profile on EUFO
Profile on FootballSquads
 
 

1980 births
2012 deaths
Footballers from Donetsk
Kharkiv State College of Physical Culture 1 alumni
Road incident deaths in Ukraine
Ukrainian footballers
FC Shakhtar-2 Donetsk players
FC Shakhtar-3 Donetsk players
FC Oleksandriya players
FC Polissya Zhytomyr players
FC Arsenal Kharkiv players
FC Helios Kharkiv players
FC Lokomotyv Dvorichna players
FC Urartu players
FC Tytan Donetsk players
FC Metalist Kharkiv players
FC Makiyivvuhillya Makiyivka players
Ukrainian Premier League players
Ukrainian First League players
Ukrainian Second League players
Ukrainian Amateur Football Championship players
Ukrainian expatriate footballers
Expatriate footballers in Armenia
Ukrainian expatriate sportspeople in Armenia
Association football midfielders